Again, The Snake Bridegroom (Serbian: Opet zmija mladoženja; German: Wieder vom Schlangenbräutigam) is a Serbian folktale collected in the 19th century by Serbian philologist Vuk Karadžić, featuring the marriage between a human maiden and a husband in serpent guise.

The tale is related to the international cycle of the Animal as Bridegroom or The Search for the Lost Husband, and shares motifs with other tales of the region, like Hungarian The Serpent Prince and Romanian Trandafiru.

Summary
A childless queen prays to God for a child, even if it is a snake. God answers her prayers and a snake child is born. They raise the child for years and finally the snake talks to its parents: he wants a bride. His parents arrange a marriage for him with a peasant girl and they marry. Some time later, the girl appears pregnant and the queen questions how that is possible if her son is a snake. The girl reveals her husband takes off the snake skin at night and becomes a handsome man. The queen delights at this information and tells her daughter-in-law she should burn the snakeskin to keep him in human form for good.

That night, the girl does as asked. Her husband awakes and curses his wife to walk with iron shoes and to not give birth until she finds him again and he places his right arm over her body, and vanishes. The girl goes after him and passes by the Mother of the Sun (who gives her a golden distaff with golden flax and a golden spindle), the Mother of the Moon (who gives her a golden hen with golden chicks) and the Mother of the Winds (who gives her a golden loom with golden yarn). The Wind directs her to another kingdom, where her husband has married another empress.

She walks a bit more and reaches the kingdom. She positions herself by the Empress's castle doors, and takes out the golden object she received to draw the Empress's attention. She trades the objects for three nights with her husband: on the first two, he does not respond to her plea, because he has drunk a sleeping potion, but on the third night, he listens to her plight and touches her belly. Their child is born (a golden-haired, golden-armed boy), and they return home.

Analysis

Tale type
The tale is classified in the Aarne-Thompson-Uther Index as type ATU 425A, "The Animal (Monster) as Bridegroom". In this tale type, the princess burns the husband's animal skin and she must seek him out, even paying a visit to the Sun, the Moon and the Wind and gaining their help. In Balkanic variants of the tale type, the supernatural husband curses his wife not to give birth to their child for a long period of time until she finds him again.

In tale type ATU 425A, the heroine journeys far and wide to encounter her husband, and finds him at the mercy of a second spouse. The supernatural husband, now human, is put to sleep by the magic potion of the second spouse, so that the heroine has no chance of rescuing him.

Others of this type include The Black Bull of Norroway, The Brown Bear of Norway, The Daughter of the Skies, East of the Sun and West of the Moon, The Tale of the Hoodie, The Sprig of Rosemary, and White-Bear-King-Valemon.

Motifs
According to Hans-Jörg Uther, the main feature of tale type ATU 425A is "bribing the false bride for three nights with the husband". In fact, when he developed his revision of Aarne-Thompson's system, Uther remarked that an "essential" trait of the tale type ATU 425A was the "wife's quest and gifts" and "nights bought".

In a study published posthumously, Romanian folklorist  noted that, in Romanian and in some South Slavic variants, instead of meeting the Sun, the Moon and the Wind on the way to her husband, the heroine finds incarnations of the days of the week, like Holy Wednesday and Holy Friday. They function the same as the elements and gift the heroine with golden objects.

Variants

Slavic
In a South Slavic tale collected by Friedrich Salomo Krauss with the title Die entzauberte Schlange ("The Enchanted Snake"), a childless couple longs to have a son. The wife declares she wants a son, even if it is a snake, so a snake is born. The husband tries to convince the wife to kill it, but the snake tells them he will live out his days in the forest. The snake works as a swineherd. A king passes by the snake's herds and feels impressed by his efforts. The snake marries the princess, who rejects him at first until she sees his true human form at night. The princess tells her mother-in-law her discovery and she suggests to burn the snakeskin, which she does. The snake husband curses his wife to not give birth to their child until he embraces her, and for her ring to stay on her finger. The husband disappears; the princess gets the help of the Wind to take to where her husband is. Despite being classified as type 425A, this tale lacks the three nights bribe of the second spouse.

Serbia 
In another Serbian tale, collected in Горња Крајина ("Gorya Krajina") by historian  and published in Letopis Matice Srpske with the title "Лијепи младић" ( Lijepi mladić, "Beautiful Youth"), a man complains to his wife that they have no son, but will be happy even if they have a snake for a son. And so it happens: the woman gives birth to a snake. Time passes, and, when the snake is old enough, he asks his parents to find him a human bride. They choose a girl and they marry. On the wedding night, the bride is afraid at first of the snake husband, until he takes off the snakeskin and becomes the titular "beautiful youth". When morning comes, the youth wears the snakeskin again. This goes on for months, until one day, the snake son's mother asks the girl about their sleeping arrangements. The girl tells her mother-in-law that the snake becomes a youth at night, and the woman advises the girl to take the snakeskin after her son is asleep, and give it to her. The girl follows through with the suggestions and steals the snakeskin for her mother-in-law, who throws it into a fire. The youth wakes up, curses his wife not to give birth to their child until he place his hands on her, then vanishes. For three years, she waits, until she decides to go on a quest for him. She passes by the Sun and its mother (who gives her a "Медуља", a "medulya"), the Moon and his mother (who also gives her a "medulya"). Finally, she passes by the Vlašićs (which are the Pleiades constellation in Serbian folk astronomy), who give her a "medulya", and tell her to go to the "Belitarians" (which, according to a compiler's note, is a group of stars). The Belitarians welcome the girl and tell her where her husband is: he is under the power of some fairies, which can be bribed with the "medulyas" the girl received. The Belitarians take her there, and the girl gives the medulyas to the fairies. Her husband touches her body and she gives birth to their child, after an eleven year long pregnancy, then they both go back home. An identical story was published by author Fran Mikuličić with the title Mladić-gad lip kodi sunce ("Snake-youth beautiful as the sun"), and sourced from Croatia. Serbian scholars noted that this tale was a variant of Vuk's.

Slovakia
In a Slovak tale collected by authors August Horislav Škultéty and Pavol Dobšinský with the title Hadogašpar ("Snake-Gaspar"), a king and a princess live in a distant kingdom. A fellow king marries the princess in a grand wedding ceremony. Years into their marriage, the now queen sees a snake in the garden and longs to have a child, even if it is a snake. So, a snake son is born to them. They name the snake son Hadogašpar. After twenty years, Hadogašpar wants to marry, but feels that no maiden will want to wed a snake. Feeling loneliness, Hadogašpar slithers away to a vast green meadow. There, a gray old man appears to him and directs the snake to a village where he may find a suitable bride. Hadogašpar slithers to the village, where a lonely maiden cries over not having a suitor. The maiden sees the snake in the water and declares she will marry the animal. The maiden and the snake marry. After the wedding, on the bridal bed, Hadogašpar asks his wife to kiss him. She does and Hadogašpar's snakeskin peels off, and he becomes a handsome prince. Hadogašpar asks his wife not to reveal anything to his mother, the queen, lest trouble befalls them. Come morning, Hadogašpar wears the snakeskin again. Time passes, and the girl becomes pregnant. Gossip begins to surround the couple, until one day the girl tells her mother-in-law about the human Hadogašpar to assuage any fear. That night, the queen takes her son's snakeskin, lights the oven and throws it in the oven to burn it. Suddenly, three large snakes leap at the human wife and circle around her belly, as Hadogašpar smells the burning and wakes up. The prince laments that his wife betrayed him, and curses her not to give birth to their child until Hadogašpar places his hand on her belly. He then disappears. Seven years pass, and the human wife - with a heavy, pregnant belly - asks for a pair of iron shoes to be made, and then begins a long quest. She passes reaches the house of the Mother of the Moon, where she gets a golden spindle (vretenice). Next, she passes by the house of the Mother of the Sun, where she gets a golden horsetail. Her last stop is by the house of the Mother of the Wind, where she gets a golden motovidielce. The Wind directs her to Hadogašpar's location: in a cave three mountains away, under the grasp of a furious Striga. The heroine walks to the cave and uses the golden objects on the Striga's servant to allow access to Hadogašpar, asleep on a stone slab, surrounded by nine snakes. On the third time, the heroine manages to wake Hadogašpar, he places his hands on his wife's belly and she gives birth to their son. Scholars  and  classified the tale as type AaTh 425A.

Slovenia
Author Adolf Hauffen collected a German language tale from Gottschee. In this tale, a rich couple pray for a son, even if it is a little animal. They pray to have a little puppy, a little kitten, and a little snake. Their first two pleas were unanswered, but they eventually have their son, a little snake. When the snake is old enough, he asks for the most beautiful maiden in town as his bride. The girl is chosen, and tries to avoid the marriage to the snake, by climbing a ladder full of blades. The pain is too much for her, so he relents and marries the snake. On the wedding night, the girl cries for her fate, but the snake husband comforts her, by telling her that she can redeem him. He takes off the snakeskin and becomes a handsome man. He insists that the snake disguise is for their own sake. Eventually, the girl becomes increasingly irritated by the prolongued use of the snakeskin, and decides to burn it. The snake husband disappears, and she - heavily pregnant - goes after him in a long quest. After seven years, the girl meets a "white woman" on the way, who tells her that her (now human) snake husband in living with a sorceress, and gives her three "Spielzeuge". The girl uses the three Spielzeuge to bribe the sorceress for three nights with her husband, only managing to talk to her husband on the third night. She then gives birth to their child.

Croatia
Linguist  collected a Croatian tale from Grada Karlovaca (Karlovac), from informant Julijana Westerbach, with the title O gušćeru mladožejni ("The Lizard Bridegroom"). In this tale, a childless couple have no child, and pray to God for a son, even if it is a lizard. So God gives them a lizard as their son, who the couple raise. When he is fifteen years old, the lizard goes to the court of the Kraj in order to woo his daughter. The kraj, however, orders the lizard to carry an egg from his house to the courtroom, without letting it fall. Passing the first task, the kraj orders the lizard to come to his castle on a beautiful carriage, then to build a palace more beautiful than the kraj. Once he accomplishes the tasks, the lizard marries the kraj's daughter. The girl cries that she is to be married to the animal. One day, she meets an old woman, who advises her to take her husband's lizard skin at night and to burn it in the fire, so he can become a handsome man. The girl follows through with the suggestion, burns the lizard skin, and learns her husband is, in fact, a handsome man underneath it. However, he wakes up and, unable to find it, he tells his wife he knows what she did, and curses her not to give birth to their child until he places his hand on her. After nine years and unable to give birth, the girl goes on a quest for him. She first passes by the Vetro (the Wind), but he does not know. He gives her a golden chair and directs her to "Jug" (the Southern Wind). Jug also does not know the girl's husband's whereabouts, but gives her a golden distaff and a golden kuditu. Later, she finds Bura (the Northern Wind), who takes her to her husband location. Bura gives her a hen with chicks and tells her to go next to the house where her husband is, sit on the golden chair and take out the golden objects to draw the attention of her husband's second spouse. The girl follows the instructions and attracts the attention of the woman that lives in the house. The woman becomes interested in the golden objects, and the girl sells each of them for a night with her husband. For two nights, she fails. The wind Bura then warns the (now human) lizard not to drink the potion the woman at the house gives him. On the third night, the girl manages to wake her husband, he places his hand on her and she gives birth to their child. After their reunion, the pair goes back home.

In a Croatian tale collected by folklorist Maja Bošković-Stulli and translated as Der Schlangenbräutigam ("The Snake-Bridegroom"), a king and a queen have no children, and the queen notices that even a snake has children, so she prays to God to have a snake-child - and God grants her wish. A snake prince is born and spends his days in the garden. One day, he asks his mother to find him a bride. Despite the queen's doubts about any girl wanting to marry a snake, the snake son insists on marrying. The queen goes to a village and finds a beautiful girl, whom she convinces to come with her and live in the palace with the royal couple. The first girl shoos the snake away; the snake feels dejected and jumps on the girl's neck to strangle her. The next time, the snake asks his parents to find another bride. The queen looks for a poor maiden and takes her in. She marries the snake prince and also dies in the wedding chambers. Lastly, the queen brings a third maiden in. During the festivities, the third maiden allows the snake to eat with her. Due to her kindness, the snake prince takes off his snakeskin that night and shows himself to his wife to be a young man "beautiful as a golden apple". Time passes, and the girl becomes pregnant. The queen asks her daughter-in-law how she can be pregnant, since her son is a snake. The princess, who - the story explains - promised to keep her husband's secret, tells the queen that the snake son becomes human at night, and the queen convinces her to burn the snakeskin in the oven. That same night, the maiden throws the snakeskin in the oven. The human snake prince smells the burning and lements his wife's deed, since in ten days' time, his curse would have been lifted. He also curses his wife not to give birth to their child, until they meet again, then vanishes. After a period of grieving, the girl - heavily pregnant - begins her long journey to find her husband. She eventually meets three brothers quarreling about their father's inheritance: a pair of boots that can leap many leagues, a cloak of invisibility, and a cap that can shoot lightning. She tricks the brothers and steals the objects, then uses the boots to reach a large, almost impenetrable castle called "Kröte-Maria-Burg", where her husband is to marry its owner, Kröte-Maria. She stands near the door to the castle, wears the cloak, puts the cap on her head and shoots lightning to scare the guests. This draws her husband's attention, who rejoices that she has found him. The girl takes off the invisibility cloak and reveals herself. The (now human) serpent bridegroom then asks the wedding guests the riddle of an old and a new key, and the guests answer he should keep the old key. On hearing this, the serpent bridegroom goes back to his human wife, who finally gives birth to their son, and they return home.

Bulgaria
A similar narrative is attested in the Bulgarian tale corpus, under tale type 425A, "Царската дъщеря, омъжена за змия (змей)" or "Die mit einer Schlange (Drachen) verheiratete Königstochter" ("The King's Daughter who married a snake/dragon"). In the Bulgarian tale type, the snake son is either found by a childless old couple or is born to one; he marries a princess and she breaks his trust; after his disappearance, the princess - pregnant - goes after him, and eventually finds the mother of the Sun, the mother of the Wind and the mother of the Moon, who gift her golden objects she uses to buy the right for a night with her husband. At the end of the tale, the heroine gives birth to her child.

In a Bulgarian tale collected by folklorist  from Elensko with the title "Мома омъжена за крилатъ змей" ("The Maiden married to a Winged Dragon"), a couple prays to God to have a son, and He sends them a snake as their son. Some time later, the snake marries a human girl. One day, the snake's mother asks her daughter-in-law about the snake. The girl answers at first that she cannot tell, but, after some insistence, she reveals he is a dragon during the day and man by night. The snake's mother suggests her daughter-in-law burns the snakeskin. The girl follows through with the suggestion, but the snake (now human) curses his wife to search for him for nine years, through nine kingdoms, with an iron staff and iron rings around her belly, and not to give birth until he touches her belly, then disappears. The girl, pregnant, begins her long quest. After three years, she reaches the house of the Mother of the Wind. After the Wind comes, he does not know about her husband, and his mother gives the human girl three apples and three magic flowers (one to sate her hunger, one to help her cross the water, and one to make her invisible). Next, she reaches the house of the Mother of the Moon. The moon also does not know of his location, but his mother gives her a golden hurka (wikt:bg:хурка) (a type of rod for spinning). Lastly, the girl reaches the house of the Mother of the Sun. The Sun does know where the winged dragon is: he is now married to a princess in the kingdom. Before she departs, the Mother of the Sun gives her a golden hen with chicks, and advises her to use the golden gifts she gained to bribe the princess for three nights with her husband, each gift for each night. The human girl gives the princess the gifts and manages to wake her husband on the third night. The now human winged dragon touches his first wife and she gives birth to a son, then they depart back home.

In a Bulgarian tale published by author Nikolay Rainov with the title "Змейова невеста" ("The Bride of the Zmei"), a childless couple sighs that they have no children, until the man decides to leave home to look for any orphan they can adopt. The man sees a little girl holding an egg on a bridge and takes her in. The next day, the egg hatches and a little zmei comes out of it. The zmei begins to talk and tells the old couple they should adopt and raise him, since they also took the girl as their daughter. Thus, the old couple raises both the girl and the zmei: the girl is lazy and does not help with the chores, unlike the zmei, who is a dutiful son and helps the old couple. In time, the girl is married to a man and leaves home to dwell with her husband, while the zmei also marries a human maiden and lives with their parents. The zmei's wife gives birth to a beautiful girl that produces gold coins when she cries and rose petals when she laughs, while the zmei's sister gives birth to an ugly child, and becomes jealous of her sister-in-law. One day, the zmei's sister pays a visit to her sister-in-law and asks her about her brother; the zmei's wife says she cannot tell anything, but, pressed by the zmei's sister, tells her he takes off the scaly skin at night and becomes a handsome man. The zmei's sister then dares her sister-in-law to take the scaly skin and burn it in the oven, so he becomes human permanently. The zmei's wife decides to follow through with the suggestion: she takes the scaly skin and burns it in the oven. The zmei, however, begins to feel a burning pain and realizes his wife betrayed his secret. He curses her that she shall seek him after nine years, beyond nine kingdoms, and in iron shoes and with an iron cane, which she will not take off until she touches him again, and vanishes. The zmei's wife tries to run away after him, but he has disappeared. The zmei's wife, then, puts on iron shoes and an iron cane, and begins her quest, but she does not know where to begin. She meets a man who tells her to seek the Wind, another suggests she seeks the Sun, and a third one she should consult with the Moon. After three years, she reaches the house of the Wind and his mother, who give her three golden apples and three magical flowers to open the way for her: one can open the way in the forest, the second can part the seas, and the third can open up two steep rocks blocking the way. After another three years, she reaches the house of the Moon and his mother, who give her a golden hurka. Lastly, after nine years, she reaches the house of the Sun and his mother. The Sun tells her that the zmei has married a princess from a nearby kingdom, and gives the zmei's wife a singing golden bird, advising her to use the golden objects to draw the princess's attention and trade them for a night with her husband. The zmei's wife follows the Sun's advice and takes out the golden apples, the golden hurka and the golden bird to bribe the princess for a night with the zmei, one gift for each night. She fails on the first two nights, but, on the next day, the zmei's wife releases the singing golden bird which flies about. The princess tries to catch it and falls to her death. The zmei wakes up and embraces his wife, forgiving her. The zmei and his true wife return home after nine years and find their daughter has had adventures of her own with her aunt, the zmei's adoptive sister.

Czech Republic
A white bear is born to her. When the bear prince is older, he asks to be married. The queen invites princesses to a ball for his son to choose his bride. The bear chooses a princess and marries her. On the wedding night, he kills the princess in a fit of rage. The bear marries another princess and also kills her. Some time later, the bear prince goes on a hunt and finds a shepherd's hut, with his daughter inside. The bear prince falls in love with the girl and wants to marry her. The shepherd's daughter comes to the castle, marries the prince and spends the night with him. The girl prays to God, the bear takes off the bearskin and becomes a man, and tells his wife to keep the secret between them. Some time later, the queen asks her new daughter-in-law about the bear son, and she tells the queen the secret. The bear disappears. The shepherd's daughter goes after him: she passes by the houses of the mother of the Moon, the mother of the Sun and the mother of the Winds. Each cooks a chicken soup for them, and tell her to take the bones with her. The Moon, the Sun and the Wind also give the girl a little box. The Wind summons the wind Melusine, who says the white bear husband is atop a glass mountain. The girl finds her husband in human form, and discovers he is to be married to another spouse. The girl asks Melusine to take her to her parents' hut. The wind does, but the girls discovers her parents have long since died. She returns with the wind to the glass mountain and takes a job offer in the castle atop the glass mountain. She decides to open the little boxes the elements gave her: inside, three beautiful dresses, one of silver, the second of gold and the third of diamond. The shepherd's daughter uses the three dresses to buy three nights with her husband from the second spouse, and manages to wake him up on the third night.

Author Božena Němcová published a Czech tale titled O bílém hadu ("The White Snake"): an old woman goes to the woods and finds a white snake on the ground, coiled and asleep. The old woman rakes it in her basket and brings the snake home to her husband. The old couple treat it as a son, giving it food. Years later, the white snake tells the man he wants to marry Bela, the local prince's daughter. The old man goes to woo the prince's daughter for the snake; but the prince sets a condition: the white snake must come on a golden road, on a carriage with silver wheels, led by white horses with pearl adornments. The old man reports back to the white snake, who arranegs everything and arrives at the prince's castle with the carriage. By the prince's own word, his daughter is to be given to snake as its bride. On the wedding night, the snake asks for a kiss, and reluctantly, the girl kisses it. The snake becomes a man. The next morning, the man tells her he is an enchanted prince, and he must not lose the snakeskin, lest they part and never see each other. By his wife's suggestion, the man gives his wife the snakeskin to be hidden under the pillow. Then they go a celebration in the couple's honor, the man kisses her, but she senses something wrong. She rushes back home and cannot find the snakeskin, since her husband disappeared. The girl searches for her husband, but cannot find him, so she rests up by a well near a willow tree and falls asleep. When she awakes, a lady in white appears before her and tells she is the snake's mother, and "dwells in the willow tree".  She gives her daughter-in-law a golden "přeslíei" with silk on one end and pearl on the other, and a silver spindle, and tells her to barter the objects with the queen from the nearby village for a night with her husband. She girl follows her instructions and sells the first item, but she cannot wake the prince, and goes back to his mother. The second time, the lady in white gives the girl a basket of flowers with golden and silver stems and jeweled petals, and suggests her to weave flower wreaths to sell to the queen. The second attempt also fails. The third time, the lady in white gives the girl a blanket woven with golden thread and pearls, which she sells for a night with the prince. Finally, the girl wakes the prince. They pass by the willow tree to give their thanks, and return to their house.

Ukraine 
In a Ukrainian tale collected by folklorist  from Khust with the title "Жених-уж и невеста-лягушка" (Ukrainian: "Жених-вуж і наречена-жаба"; English: "The Bridegroom-Snake and the Bride-Frog"), a boy begins to behave badly, and his widow mother curses him to become a reptile. He turns into a snake and creeps away to the mountains. Meanwhile, a local king becomes blind, and his only cure is water from a certain fountain. Each of this daughters goes to the fountain to fetch some water in a jug, but a mysterious voice scares the elder two away, while the youngest princess daringly takes some water. The voice tells her she will become the voice's bride, and the princess retorts: "So be it". The third princess brings the water to cure her father, and tells him about the voice. The king advises her to fulfill her promise. Thus, the princess wears a black dress and waits in her room for whoever was at the fountain. A snake slithers into her room, and asks her to turn off the light. She does; the snake takes off the snakeskin to become a golden-haired youth whose hair illuminates the whole room. The youth then asks the princess not to reveal the secret. The next morning, the princess's sisters mock her for having a mysterious husband, and she answers she has a handsome human husband. Later that day, the princess's sisters take the snakeskin and burn it in an oven. When the youth awakes, he cannot find the snakeskin, so he curses his wife not to give birth to any child until he places two fingers on her, then departs to a kingdom beyond the Black Sea. A year, a year and a half passes; the princess, heavily pregnant, wraps iron circles around her belly and begins a long quest. She passes by the hut of the First Wind and its father (who give her a golden hen with golden chicks), the Second Wind and its mother-in-law (who give her a golden yarn and a golden spindle), and the Third Wind and its father. The Third Wind returns from a journey around the world and tells the princess he saw her husband's second wife trying to wash a bloodied shirt in the kingdom beyond the Black Sea, and gives her a ball, advising her to reach the kingdom and trade the items with the woman. Following its orders, the princess reaches the kingdom beyond the Black Sea, and washes the bloodied shirt for her. The princess then trades the golden objects for three nights with her husband; for the first two nights, he lies asleep due to a sleeping draught, but manages to wake him up on the third night. He wakes up and places his fingers on her; she gives birth to twin boys, one golden-haired, like the father, and another without golden hair. The tale then continues with the adventures of the golden-haired twin, who grows up and marries a frog that turns into a human princess.

In a Ukrainian tale from Podolia published by Ukrainian literary critic  with the title "Як зачарований королевич-вуж засватав царівну" ("How the enchanted Prince-Snake wooed the Princess"), an old woodcutter lives with his wife in the woods. One day, he goes out to gather firewood and brings home a snake. The man and his wife decide to adopt it as their son. Years later, the snake begins to talk and asks them to woo the princess for him as his bride. Despite the old couple's worries that no human woman will wish to marry a snake, they agree to it, and the old man goes to the king to propose on his son's behalf. The king agrees to the proposal, but sets a test for the snake: he should jump to the third store window and grab the princess's signet ring. The old man explains the test to the snake and he accomplishes the feat. The old man returns the ring to the king, who tosses it in the sea and orders the snake to find it. The snake also fulfills the task. The snake is brought on a plate to the princess, who cannot stop crying. Time passes, and the king invites his daughter and her husband to a feast at the palace. The princess cries over the possibility of taking a snake to a feast, but the snake takes off the snakeskin to become a human youth, locks it in a chest, and takes the princess to the castle. While her husband is dining with her father, she runs back home, opens up the chest, takes the snakeskin and burns it. The snake husband, in human form, follows his wife home and, seeing the burnt snakeskin, hits her on the nose, some drops of blood falling on his shirt. He proclaims they are no longer husband and wife, and vanishes. Later, the princess begins to search for him and meets three women on the road: one spinning threads of golden flax, another working on a golden reel, and the third taking a golden hen and its golden chicks to graze. The princess buys the golden objects from each of them by 100 coins each, and continues her journey until she reaches a river where some launderesses are trying to wash a bloodied shirt. The princess offers to wash it and cleans the droplets of blood. She then asks for a job as a goose-herder in the nearby castle. Some time later, she princess takes out the golden objects and bribes the mistress of the castle, the snake husband's new wife, to spend a night with the now human snake husband. The mistress of the castle agrees and lets her in, but she gives a sleeping potion to the man for the first two nights. On the third night, the princess pricks his skin with a needle and he wakes up. They reconcile, and the snake husband sends the mistress of the castle away.

See also
Tales about serpent husbands:
 The Serpent Prince
 The Enchanted Snake
 The Green Serpent
 Tulisa, the Wood-Cutter's Daughter
 Khastakhumar and Bibinagar
 Habrmani
 King Lindworm
 Eglė the Queen of Serpents
Princess Himal and Nagaray
The Snake Prince
Monyohe (Sotho)
Umamba (Zulu folktale)
Baemsillang (The Serpent Husband)
Amewakahiko soshi
 Yasmin and the Serpent Prince
 Champavati
 The King of the Snakes

Footnotes

References 

Serbian fairy tales
Fictional snakes
Fiction about shapeshifting
Male characters in fairy tales
Fictional princes
Fictional Serbian people
ATU 400-459